Motel California is the third album by the American rock band Ugly Kid Joe, and released on October 22, 1996. Motel California was the last full-length studio album until 2015. The group disbanded in January 1997 and reformed in 13 years later in January 2010. The album received lukewarm reviews and was a commercial failure.

The title is a parody of the Eagles' album, Hotel California. The song "Rage Against the Answering Machine" is a pun on the name of the Los Angeles rock band Rage Against the Machine.

Production
The album was recorded with the Butcher Bros., in Philadelphia.

Critical reception
AllMusic wrote that Ugly Kid Joe "return to their roots, bashing out grungy metal in their garage and recording it for posterity ...  Motel California works a lot better than it should, sounding fiercer and more committed."

Track listing

Lineup
 Whitfield Crane – vocals
 Dave Fortman – guitar
 Klaus Eichstadt – guitar
 Cordell Crockett – bass
 Shannon Larkin – drums
 Lemmy Kilmister - guest backing vocals on "Little Red Man"

References

1996 albums
Ugly Kid Joe albums